Giliberti may refer to:

Jullye Giliberti (born 1976), Venezuelan actress
6339 Giliberti, a main-belt asteroid